SMS Württemberg  was one of four  armored frigates of the German Imperial Navy. Württemberg was built in the AG Vulcan shipyard in Stettin from 1876 to 1881. The ship was commissioned into the Imperial Navy in August 1881. She was armed with a main battery of six  guns in two open barbettes.

After her commissioning, Württemberg served with the fleet on numerous training exercises and cruises. She participated in several cruises escorting Kaiser Wilhelm II on state visits to Great Britain and to various cities in the Baltic Sea in the late 1880s and early 1890s. During 1898–1899, the ship was modernized at the Imperial Dockyard in Kiel; she served for another seven years with the fleet before being withdrawn from active service in 1906. She was subsequently used in a variety of secondary roles, until she was sold in 1920 and broken up for scrap.

Design 

The Sachsen class was the first group of capital ships built under the tenure of General Albrecht von Stosch, the first Chief of the Imperial Admiralty. Stosch favored a coastal defense strategy for the German fleet, and the Sachsens were intended to operate from fortified ports, from which they could sortie to attack blockading fleets. They proved to be controversial in service, as critics pointed out their poor seakeeping, tendency to roll in heavy seas, and low speed compared to earlier armored frigates.

Württemberg was powered by two 3-cylinder single-expansion steam engines, which were supplied with steam by eight coal-fired Dürr boilers. The boilers were vented into four funnels in an unusual square arrangement. Her standard complement consisted of 32 officers and 285 enlisted men, though while serving as a squadron flagship this was augmented by another 7 officers and 34 men.

She was armed with a main battery of six  guns, two of which were single-mounted in an open barbette forward of the conning tower and the remaining four mounted amidships, also on single mounts in an open barbette. As built, the ship was also equipped with six  L/24 guns and eight  Hotchkiss revolver cannons for defense against torpedo boats. 

Württembergs armor was made of wrought iron, and was concentrated in an armored citadel amidships. The barbette armor was 254 mm of wrought iron backed by 250 mm of teak.

Service history 

Württemberg was ordered by the Imperial Navy under the contract name "D," which denoted that the vessel was a new addition to the fleet. She was built at the AG Vulcan shipyard in Stettin; her keel was laid down in 1876 under yard number 78. The ship was launched on 9 November 1878 and was commissioned into the German fleet on 9 May 1881. Along with her three sisters, Württemberg was the first large, armored warship built for the German navy that relied entirely on engines for propulsion. 

After her commissioning, Württemberg was placed in reserve. She was not activated for service with the fleet until 1884; this in part had to do with the poor performance of her sister  in the fleet maneuvers of 1880. Among the problems associated with the Sachsen-class ships was a tendency to roll dangerously due to their flat bottoms, which greatly reduced the accuracy of their guns. The ships were also poorly armored, compared to their contemporaries. In addition, they were slow and suffered from poor maneuverability. Nevertheless, Württemberg and her three sisters served as I Division in the 1884 fleet maneuvers, under the command of Rear Admiral Alexander von Monts. The ship was again placed in reserve in 1885, but returned to fleet service in 1886 alongside Sachsen, and the new ironclad . During the annual fleet maneuvers, Württembergs engines proved troublesome.

Following the 1886 maneuvers, Württemberg and her three sisters were removed from active duty to serve as the Baltic reserve division. In June 1887, Germany dedicated the Kaiser Wilhelm Canal; Württemberg was among the ships present during the celebrations. The ship returned to active service with the fleet in 1890 when she joined I Division during the annual maneuvers. Württemberg was commanded by Captain Alfred von Tirpitz during the exercises. The eight ships of I and II Divisions simulated a Russian fleet blockading Kiel, which was defended by torpedo boat flotillas. Württemberg was in reserve during the 1891 maneuvers, but returned to I Division in 1892, 1893, and 1894. By the winter of 1894–1895, the last of the four s had been commissioned; these ships were assigned to I Division, which displaced Württemberg and her three sisters to II Division. The eight ships conducted training cruises over the winter and spring before conducting the annual autumn fleet exercises.

On 21 June 1895, the Kaiser Wilhelm Canal was opened for traffic, eight years after work had begun. Württemberg and her three sisters, along with dozens of other warships, attended the ceremonies. The major naval powers sent fleets to join the fleet review. The Autumn 1895 maneuvers simulated a high-seas battle between I and II Divisions in the North Sea, followed by combined maneuvers with the rest of the fleet in the Baltic. Württemberg again served during the 1896 and 1897 maneuvers, though Sachsen was her only sister to join the exercises. Baden and Bayern were out of service for extensive modernization.

After the conclusion of the 1897 maneuvers, Württemberg was taken into drydock at the Imperial Dockyard in Kiel for reconstruction. The ship's old wrought iron and teak armor was replaced with new Krupp nickel-steel armor. The ship's 8.7 cm guns were replaced with quick-firing  SK L/30 guns and four  autocannons. Work was completed in 1898. Württemberg remained with the fleet until 1906; her replacement in the fleet organization plan, the new dreadnought battleship , was ordered that year. Württemberg was then used as a torpedo training and test ship until February 1919, when she was reduced to an escort for F-type minesweepers. The ship was stricken from the naval register on 20 October 1920 and sold to Hattinger Co. Württemberg was ultimately broken up for scrap in Wilhelmshaven.

Footnotes

Notes

Citations

References 

 
 

 

Sachsen-class ironclads
1878 ships
Ships built in Stettin